Pathum Madusanka (born 13 January 1996) is a Sri Lankan cricketer. He made his first-class debut for Badureliya Sports Club in the 2015–16 Premier League Tournament on 4 December 2015. He made his Twenty20 debut for Badureliya Sports Club on 15 February 2019.

References

External links
 

1996 births
Living people
Sri Lankan cricketers
Badureliya Sports Club cricketers
Nugegoda Sports and Welfare Club cricketers
Cricketers from Colombo